Lived is the first compilation of the trilogy released by Babes in Toyland. It was produced by Tim Mac, and released May 2000 by Almafame.

Track listing
All songs by Babes in Toyland (except Tracks 1, 12, and 13)

Introduction: Dr. Timothy Leary (recorded at Lollapolooza San Francisco; June 22, 1993)
"He's My Thing" (recorded at Chicago Metro; May 17, 1991)
"Handsome and Gretel" (recorded at Lollapalooza San Francisco; June 22, 1993)
"Bluebell" (recorded at Lollapalooza San Francisco; June 22, 1993)
"Sweet 69" (recorded at Minneapolis 1st Avenue; January 7, 1995)
"Ripe" (recorded at Utrecht, Holland; December 19, 1990)
"Mad Pilot" (recorded at TJ's Newport; December 18, 1991)
"Right Now" (recorded at Lollapalooza San Francisco; June 22, 1993)
"Dogg" (recorded at Chicago Metro; May 17, 1991)
"Fork Down Throat" (recorded at Minneapolis 7th Street Entry; February 25, 1988)
"Ya Know That Guy" (recorded at Minneapolis 7th Street Entry; February 25, 1988)
"Bubble, Bubble, Toil & Trouble"
"Fair Is Foul & Foul Is Fair"
"Big Top"
Multimedia on disc
15. "Astroantiquity" (recorded at Mill City Music Festival; January 9, 1997)
16. "Bruise Violet" (recorded at Mill City Music Festival; January 9, 1997)
17. "Memory" (recorded at Mill City Music Festival; January 9, 1997)

"Bubble, Bubble, Toil & Trouble" and "Fair Is Foul & Foul Is Fair" are Babes in Toyland singing the Three Witches parts in Shakespeare's Macbeth.

Personnel
Kat Bjelland  - Guitar, vocals
Lori Barbero - drums, vocals
Maureen Herman - Bass on Tracks 3, 4, 5, 7, 8, 9, 13,and 14
Michelle Leon - Bass on Tracks 2, 6, 10, 11, 12

References

Babes in Toyland (band) compilation albums
2000 live albums
2000 compilation albums
Live grunge albums